Just Another Day is a short film by the Palestinian visual artist and filmmaker Hisham Zreiq (Zrake). The film deals with post 9/11 status of Arabs in the Western world, via the story of a young Arab man that lives in Europe after the September 11 terror attacks.  The story is told in a day when his city is struck by another terror attack, in a sad chapter of his life, because he is suffering after the woman he loves left him – precisely because he is an Arab.

The film is full of symbols, and a surrealistic atmosphere resembling Hisham Zreiq's art.

Film festivals 
 18th Damascus International Film Festival, 2010, Syria (nominated)
 Salento International Filem Festival, 2010, Italy (nominated)
 Al Ard Doc Film Festival, 2011, Cagliari, Italy
 Palestine Film Festival in Madrid, 2010, Spain 
 Chicago Palestine Film Festival, 2009, USA

See also
 Hisham Zreiq
 The Sons of Eilaboun
 List of Palestinian films

External links

References

German short films
2000s German-language films
Palestinian short films
2000s Arabic-language films
2008 films
2008 short films
2008 multilingual films
German multilingual films